Michigan's 27th Senate district is one of 38 districts in the Michigan Senate. The 27th district was created by the 1850 Michigan Constitution, as the 1835 constitution only permitted a maximum of eight senate districts. It has been represented by Democrat John Cherry III since 2023, succeeding fellow Democrat Jim Ananich.

Geography
District 27 encompasses part of Genesee County.

2011 Apportionment Plan
District 27, as dictated by the 2011 Apportionment Plan, was based in Flint, also covering the surrounding Genesee County communities of Burton, Clio, Mount Morris, Swartz Creek, Flint Township, Mount Morris Township, Genesee Township, and Vienna Township.

The district was located entirely within Michigan's 5th congressional district, and overlapped with the 34th, 48th, 49th, and 50th districts of the Michigan House of Representatives.

List of senators

Recent election results

2018

2014

2013 special
In January 2013, incumbent senator John J. Gleason assumed office as Clerk/Register of Deeds for Genesee County, triggering a special election that May.

Federal and statewide results in District 27

Historical district boundaries

References 

27
Genesee County, Michigan